Ilyasov or Ilyasova is a Slavic surname. It may refer to
Ersan İlyasova (born 1987), Turkish basketball player who currently plays for the Milwaukee Bucks (as of February 2019)
Robert Ilyasov (born 1973), Russian rugby league player 
 Yury Ilyasov (1926–2005), Soviet high jumper